"Rip Van Winkle" is a short story by American author Washington Irving, published in 1819.

Rip Van Winkle may also refer to:

Art, entertainment, and media

Films
 Rip Van Winkle (1903 film), American short black-and-white silent compilation film
 Rip Van Winkle (1910 film), lost film by the Thanhouser Company
 Rip Van Winkle (1912 film), Australian feature-length film
 Rip Van Winkle (1914 film), film with cinematography by Sol Polito 
 Rip Van Winkle (1921 film), directed by Ward Lascelle
 Rip Van Winkle (1978 film), directed by Will Vinton

Music
"Rip Van Winkle", a song by the Doo-Wop Rock 'n Roll trio Shannon and the Clams on their first LP, Dreams in the Rat House
"Rip Van Winkle", a single by The Devotions released in 1961, 1962, and 1964
"Rip Van Winkle", song by the American stoner/doom metal band Witch on their 2006 debut record Witch

Other art, entertainment, and media
 Rip Van Winkle (operetta), an operetta in three acts by Robert Planquette
 Rip Van Winkle, a tone poem by Ferde Grofé
 Rip van Winkle, manga character, see list of Hellsing characters

Other uses
 Rip Van Winkle (horse) (2006-2020), a Thoroughbred racehorse
 MV Rip Van Winkle, a Hudson River tour boat based in Kingston, New York
 Rip van Winkle cipher, a provably secure cipher
 Rip Van Winkle Bridge, a cantilever bridge spanning the Hudson River between Hudson and Catskill, New York
 Rip Van Winkle, a bus company, a predecessor to Trailways of New York
 Old Rip Van Winkle bourbon whiskey

See also